The Civil War Trust's Civil War Discovery Trail is a heritage tourism program that links more than 600 U.S. Civil War sites in more than 30 states. The program is one of the White House Millennium Council's sixteen flagship National Millennium Trails. Sites on the trail include battlefields, museums, historic sites, forts and cemeteries.

In May 2018, the Civil War Trust, along with the Revolutionary War Trust, changed operational structure to function as land preservation divisions of the American Battlefield Trust. The places of the formerly named trail are highlighted on the American Battlefield Trust's website as heritage sites. The following is a list of these sites as of March 2014.

Sites

Alabama 

 Alabama Department of Archives and History
 Alabama State Capitol
 Belle Mont Mansion
 Bridgeport Depot Museum
 Brierfield Ironworks Historical State Park
 Confederate Memorial Park
 Cornwall Furnace
 Fendall Hall
 First White House of the Confederacy
 Fort Gaines Historic Site
 Fort Morgan Historic Site
 Historic Blakeley State Park
 Janney Furnace Park
 Old Cahawba Archaeological Park
 Old Depot Museum
 Old Live Oak Cemetery
 Old State Bank and Civil War Walking Tour
 Pond Spring
 Selma Historic District
 Shorter Cemetery
 Tannehill Ironworks Historical State Park
 Vaughan-Smitherman Museum

Arkansas 

 Arkansas Post National Memorial
 Battery C Park
 Buffalo National River, Tyler Bend Visitors Center
 Camp Nelson Confederate Cemetery
 Camp White Sulphur Springs Confederate Cemetery
 Chalk Bluff Park
 City of Clarendon
 Delta Cultural Center
 Ditch Bayou Battlefield
 Fort Smith Museum of History
 Fort Smith National Cemetery
 Fort Smith National Historic Site
 Fort Southerland Park
 Headquarters House Museum
 Helena Confederate Cemetery
 Helena, Arkansas, Civil War Sites Driving Tour
 Historic Washington State Park
 Jacksonport State Park
 Jenkins' Ferry State Park
 Lake Chicot State Park
 Little Rock Campaign Driving Tour
 Little Rock National Cemetery
 MacArthur Museum of Arkansas Military History
 Marks' Mills Battlefield State Park
 Massard Prairie Battlefield Park
 McCollum-Chidester House Museum
 Mount Elba Battlefield
 Mount Holly Cemetery
 Old State House Museum
 Pea Ridge National Military Park
 Poison Spring State Park
 Prairie Grove Battlefield State Park
 Reed's Bridge Battlefield
 Skirmish at Jonesboro, Arkansas
 Southern Memorial Association
 St. Charles Museum
 White Oak Lake State Park

California 

 Drum Barracks Civil War Museum
 Fort Point
 Golden Gate National Recreation Area (Alcatraz Island)
 Presidio of San Francisco

Connecticut 

 General Mansfield House

Delaware 

 Fort Delaware State Park

District of Columbia 

 African American Civil War Memorial Museum
 Church of the Epiphany
 Civil War Defenses of Washington
 Civil War to Civil Rights: Downtown Heritage Trail
 Ford's Theatre National Historic Site
 Frederick Douglass National Historic Site
 Lincoln Memorial
 National Building Museum
 New York Avenue Presbyterian Church
 President Lincoln's Cottage
 The Navy Museum and the Washington Navy Yards
 Ulysses S. Grant Memorial
 United States Soldiers' and Airmen's Home National Cemetery

Florida 

 Camp Milton Historic Preserve
 Castillo de San Marcos National Monument
 Fort Barrancas, Gulf Islands National Seashore
 Fort Clinch State Park
 Fort East Martello Museum and Gardens
 Fort Jefferson, Dry Tortugas National Park
 Fort Pickens, Gulf Islands National Seashore
 Fort Ward, San Marcos de Apalache Historic State Park
 Fort Zachary Taylor Historic State Park
 Gamble Plantation Historic State Park
 Jupiter Inlet Lighthouse
 Knott House Museum
 Museum of Florida History
 Museum of Science and History
 Museum of Southern History
 Natural Bridge Battlefield Historic State Park
 Olustee Battlefield Historic State Park
 Segui-Kirby Smith House
 St. Marks Lighthouse at St. Marks National Wildlife Refuge
 Wardlaw-Smith-Goza Conference Center
 Yulee Sugar Mill Ruins Historic State Park

Georgia 

 Alexander H. Stephens State Historic Park
 Andersonville National Historic Site
 Atlanta Campaign Pavilion Parks
 Atlanta Cyclorama & Civil War Museum
 Atlanta History Center
 Augusta Museum of History
 Blue and Gray Museum
 Blue and Gray Trail
 Bulloch Hall
 Cannonball House and Museum
 Chickamauga and Chattanooga National Military Park / Chickamauga Battlefield
 Dalton Confederate Cemetery
 Fort James Jackson
 Fort McAllister State Historic Park
 Fort Pulaski National Monument
 Fort Tyler
 Georgia State Capitol
 Georgia's Stone Mountain Park
 Gordon-Lee Mansion
 Green-Meldrim House
 Griswoldville Battlefield & Monument
 Historic Oakland Cemetery
 Kennesaw Mountain National Battlefield Park
 Magnolia Springs State Park
 Male Academy Museum
 Marietta National Cemetery
 Nash Farm Battlefield
 National Civil War Naval Museum at Port Columbus
 Pickett's Mill Battlefield State Historic Site
 Prater's Mill
 Resaca Confederate Cemetery
 Robert Toombs House Historic Site
 Savannah History Museum
 Southern Museum of Civil War and Locomotive History
 Sweetwater Creek State Conservation Park
 The Old Governor's Mansion
 Tunnel Hill Heritage Center and Clisby Austin House
 Washington Historical Museum
 Western and Atlantic Passenger Depot

Illinois 

 Abraham Lincoln Presidential Library and Museum
 Alton Military Prison Site
 Bureau County Historical Society Museum
 Cairo Public Library
 Camp Butler National Cemetery
 Customs House
 Daughters of Union Veterans of the Civil War
 David Davis Mansion State Historic Site
 General John A. Logan Museum
 Grand Army of the Republic Memorial Museum
 Lincoln Home National Historic Site
 Lincoln Tomb, Oak Ridge Cemetery
 Mound City National Cemetery
 Museum of Funeral Customs
 Old State Capitol
 Rock Island Arsenal Museum and Rock Island Arsenal
 Rosehill Cemetery and Civil War Museum
 St. Charles Heritage Center and Camp Kane
 Thomas Lincoln Cemetery
 U.S. Grant Home State Historic Site

Indiana 

 Corydon Battlefield
 General Lew Wallace Study and Museum
 Historic Eleutherian College
 John Hunt Morgan Heritage Trail
 Lincoln Amphitheater and Lincoln State Park
 Lincoln Boyhood Home National Memorial

International 

 E.D. White Historic Site
 La Cite De La Mer
 Scottish-American Soldiers Monument
 The Globe Hotel and Bermuda National Trust Museum
 Wirral Maritime Heritage Trail

Kansas 

 Baxter Springs Heritage Center and Museum
 Fort Scott National Cemetery
 Fort Scott National Historic Site
 Mine Creek Battlefield State Historic Site
 Territorial Capital Museum
 U.S. Cavalry Museum

Kentucky 

 Abraham Lincoln Birthplace National Historical Park
 Ashland: The Henry Clay Estate
 Battle of Richmond
 Battle of Sacramento Driving Tour
 Behringer-Crawford Museum
 Camp Nelson
 Camp Wildcat Civil War Battlefield
 Cave Hill Cemetery and Arboretum
 Civil War Driving Tour of Bowling Green and Warren County
 Columbus-Belmont State Park
 Cumberland Gap National Historical Park
 Downtown Paducah Civil War Walking Tour
 Farmington Historic Plantation
 Fort Duffield Park and Historic Site
 Fort Smith
 Frankfort Cemetery
 General John Hunt Morgan's Brandenburg Raid
 Green Hill Cemetery
 Hardin County History Museum
 Hart County Historical Society Museum
 Historic Homes and Landmarks Tour of Lebanon
 Hunt-Morgan House
 Ivy Mountain Battlefield
 Jefferson Davis Memorial Historic Site
 Jefferson Davis Monument State Historic Site
 Kentucky Gateway Museum Center
 Kentucky Military History Museum
 Kentucky State Capitol
 Leslie Morris Park at Fort Hill
 Lexington Cemetery
 Mary Todd Lincoln House
 Middle Creek National Battlefield
 Mill Springs Battlefield
 Morgan's Raids at Cynthiana
 Mountain Homeplace
 Munfordville Battlefield
 Octagon Hall Museum/Kentucky Confederate Studies Archive
 Old Bardstown Village Civil War Museum
 Old Fort Harrod State Park
 Old Washington
 Perryville Battlefield Preservation Association
 Perryville Battlefield State Historic Site
 Pewee Valley Confederate Cemetery and Monument
 Riverview at Hobson Grove
 Shaker Museum at South Union
 Simpson County Archives and Museum (old Simpson County Jail And Jailer's Residence)
 Spalding Hall
 Tebbs Bend - Green River Bridge Battlefield
 The Samuel May House Living History Museum
 The Shaker Village of Pleasant Hill
 Town of Perryville
 Waveland
 White Hall State Historic House
 Zollicoffer Park

Louisiana 

 Academy of the Sacred Heart
 Baton Rouge Museum
 Camp Moore/Confederate Museum and Cemetery
 Centenary State Historic Site and Jackson Confederate Cemetery
 Chretien Point Plantation
 Clinton Confederate State Cemetery
 Confederate Museum
 Fort DeRussy State Historic Site
 Fort Jackson
 Fort Pike State Historic Site
 Frogmore Cotton Plantation and Gins
 Grant's Canal, Byerley House
 Herbert S. Ford Memorial Museum
 Kent Plantation
 Louisiana State Museum Capitol Park
 Mansfield State Historic Site
 Niblett's Bluff Park
 Nottoway Plantation
 Old Arsenal Museum
 Old U.S. Mint
 Pentagon Barracks
 Port Hudson State Historic Site
 Rene Beauregard House—Jean Lafitte National Historical Park and Preserve
 Shadows-on-the-Teche
 Snyder Museum
 The Cabildo
 Winter Quarters State Historic Site

Maine 

 Fifth Maine Regimental Museum
 Fort Knox State Historic Site
 Joshua L. Chamberlain Museum

Maryland 

 Antietam National Battlefield
 B&O Railroad Museum
 Baltimore & Ohio Ellicott City Station Museum
 Baltimore Civil War Museum
 Barbara Fritchie House and Museum
 Camden Station
 Chesapeake and Ohio Canal National Historical Park
 Clara Barton National Historic Site
 Dr. Samuel A. Mudd Home and Museum
 Fort Foote Park
 Fort Frederick State Park
 Fort McHenry National Monument and Historic Shrine
 Fort Washington Park
 Historic Ships in Baltimore
 Kennedy Farmhouse
 Marietta House Museum
 Maryland Historical Society
 Monocacy National Battlefield
 Montgomery County Historical Society
 Mount Olivet Cemetery
 National Museum of Civil War Medicine
 National Museum of Health and Medicine
 Point Lookout State Park and Civil War Museum
 Pry House Field Hospital Museum
 South Mountain State Battlefield
 Surratt House Museum
 Thomas Viaduct

Massachusetts 

 Boston African American National Historic Site
 Clara Barton Birthplace

Minnesota 

 Birch Coulee Battlefield State Historic Site
 Fort Ridgely State Historic Site
 Historic Fort Snelling

Mississippi 

 Battery F
 Battery Robinett
 Beauvoir: The Jefferson Davis Home and Presidential Library
 Brice's Crossroads Battlefield Visitor and Interpretive Center
 Campaign of 1862- Driving Tour of Corinth Campaign
 Confederate Cemetery
 Corinth Civil War Interpretive Center
 Corinth Contraband Camp
 Corinth National Cemetery
 Crossroads Museum
 Driving Tour of Historic Raymond
 Fort Massachusetts on West Ship Island
 Fort Pemberton
 Friendship Cemetery
 Grand Gulf Military Monument Park
 Grenada Lake
 Longwood
 Manship House Museum
 Marshall County Historical Museum
 Melrose
 Mississippi Governor's Mansion
 Natchez National Cemetery
 Old Capitol Museum of Mississippi History
 Old Court House Museum and Eva W. Davis Memorial
 Port Gibson Battlefield
 Rail Crossing-Trailhead Park
 Raymond Battlefield
 Raymond Courthouse
 Rosemont Plantation/ Home of Jefferson Davis
 St. Marks Episcopal Church
 The Beauregard Line
 The Oaks House Museum
 The Verandah-Curlee House
 The William Johnson House
 Tupelo National Battlefield
 Vicksburg Battlefield Museum
 Vicksburg National Military Park
 Waverley Plantation Mansion
 Windsor Ruins

Missouri 

 Battle of Athens State Historic Site
 Battle of Carthage Civil War Museum
 Battle of Carthage State Historic Site
 Battle of Lexington State Historic Site
 Battle of Springfield
 Battle Of Westport
 Bellefontaine Cemetery
 Bushwhacker Museum
 Calvary Cemetery
 Confederate Memorial State Historic Site
 Forest Hill Cemetery
 Fort Davidson State Historic Site
 Hunter-Dawson State Historic Site
 Jefferson Barracks State Historic Site
 Missouri History Museum
 Missouri State Capitol and State Museum
 Newtonia Battlefield
 Springfield National Cemetery
 Stoddard County Civil War Memorial Cemetery
 The Jesse James Bank Museum
 The Jesse James Farm and Museum
 The Lone Jack Historical Society
 The Stars and Stripes Museum and Library
 Ulysses S. Grant National Historic Site
 Wilson's Creek Civil War Museum
 Wilson's Creek National Battlefield

New Mexico 

 Fort Craig National Historic Site
 Fort Stanton
 Glorieta Battlefield

New York 

 General Grant National Memorial
 Green-Wood Cemetery
 Ulysses S. Grant Cottage State Historic Site
 Woodlawn National Cemetery

North Carolina 

 Averasboro Battlefield
 Beaufort Historic Site
 Bellamy Mansion Museum of History and Design Arts
 Bennett Place State Historic Site
 Bentonville Battlefield State Historic Site
 Brunswick Town/Fort Anderson State Historic Site
 CSS Neuse State Historic Site
 Dare County Civil War Heritage Trail
 Dr. Josephus W. Hall House
 Edenton Bell Battery Cannon
 Fort Branch
 Fort Fisher State Historic Site
 Fort Macon State Park
 Greensboro Historical Museum
 Historic Carson House
 Malcolm Blue Farm
 Museum of the Albemarle
 Museum of the Cape Fear/Arsenal Park
 North Carolina Museum of History
 North Carolina State Capitol
 Orange County Historical Museum
 Port O' Plymouth Museum
 Rowan Museum
 Salisbury National Cemetery
 Smith-McDowell House
 Somerset Place State Historic Site
 Zebulon B. Vance Birthplace State Historic Site

Ohio 

 Buffington Island State Memorial
 Camp Chase Confederate Cemetery
 Custer Monument State Memorial
 John P. Parker Historic Site
 Johnson's Island Cemetery
 McCook House
 Ohio Statehouse
 Rankin House
 Ripley Museum
 Rutherford B. Hayes Presidential Center
 Sherman House Museum
 Spring Grove Cemetery and Arboretum
 The Harriet Beecher Stowe House
 Ulysses S. Grant Birthplace State Memorial

Oklahoma 

 Cabin Creek Battlefield
 Confederate Memorial Museum and Cemetery
 Fort Gibson Historic Site
 Fort Towson Historic Site
 Fort Washita Historic Site
 George M. Murrell Home
 Honey Springs Battlefield
 Oklahoma History Center

Pennsylvania 

 Chambersburg/Franklin County Civil War Driving Tour
 Civil War and Underground Railroad Museum of Philadelphia
 Clarence Clark Park
 David Wills House
 General Lee's Headquarters
 Gettysburg Guided Historic Walking Tours
 Gettysburg Heritage Sites Self-Guided Walking Tour
 Gettysburg National Military Park
 Grand Army of The Republic Civil War Museum and Library
 Historical Society of Pennsylvania
 Jennie Wade House Museum
 Lancaster County's Historical Society & President James Buchanan's Wheatland
 Laurel Hill Cemetery
 LeMoyne House
 Pennsylvania Civil War Battle Flags Collection
 Soldiers and Sailors Memorial Hall and Museum
 The American House of Fritztown & Pappy G's Tavern
 The John Harris-Simon Cameron Mansion
 The Johnson House Historic Site
 The National Civil War Museum
 The Shriver House Museum
 The State Museum of Pennsylvania
 The Woodlands Cemetery
 U.S. Army Heritage and Education Center

Rhode Island 

 Fort Adams

South Carolina 

 Battery 5, James Island New Lines
 Battery White
 Beaufort National Cemetery
 Burt-Stark Mansion
 Cheraw Civil War Sites
 Coastal Discovery Museum at Honey Horn
 Drayton Hall
 Florence National Cemetery
 Fort Howell
 Fort Lamar Historic Preserve
 Fort Moultrie
 Fort Sumter National Monument
 Heyward House Historic Center
 Rivers Bridge State Historic Site
 South Carolina Civil War Museum
 South Carolina Confederate Relic Room and Museum
 South Carolina State House
 South Carolina State Museum
 The H.L. Hunley Project and Submarine Tours

Tennessee 

 Abraham Lincoln Library and Museum
 Andrew Johnson National Historic Site
 Battle of Hartsville Driving Tour
 Battle of Nashville Tour Map
 Battles for Chattanooga Museum
 Belle Meade Plantation
 Belmont Mansion
 Britton Lane Battlefield
 Carnton Plantation
 Chattanooga History Center
 Chattanooga National Cemetery
 Chickamauga and Chattanooga National Military Park/ Chattanooga Battlefields
 Confederate Memorial Hall (Bleak House)
 Confederate Memorial Park at Winstead Hill
 Copy of Shiloh Battlefield
 Copy of Shiloh Battlefield
 Davis Bridge Battlefield
 Dickson-Williams Mansion
 Dover Hotel (Surrender House), Fort Donelson National Battlefield
 East Tennessee History Center
 Fort Defiance/Fort Sevier/Fort Bruce
 Fort Dickerson
 Fort Donelson National Battlefield
 Fort Granger
 Fort Pillow State Historic Park
 Fortress Rosecrans, Stones River National Battlefield
 From Bridge to Bridge Driving Tour Brochure
 Historic Chockley Tavern
 Johnsonville State Historic Park
 Johnsonville State Historic Park
 Knoxville Driving Tour, Siege of Knoxville and Battle of Fort Sanders
 Mabry-Hazen House Museum and Bethel Cemetery
 McGavock Confederate Cemetery
 Memphis National Cemetery
 Memphis Pink Palace Museum
 Mississippi River Museum at Mud Island
 Nashville National Cemetery
 Nathan Bedford Forrest Park
 Nathan Bedford Forrest State Park
 Oaklands Historic House Museum
 Old Gray Cemetery
 Parker's Crossroads Battlefield Self-Guided Tour
 Salem Cemetery Battlefield
 Sam Davis Home
 Shiloh Battlefield
 Shy's Hill
 Stones River National Battlefield
 Tennessee River Museum
 Tennessee State Museum and State Capitol
 The Athenaeum Rectory
 The Carter House
 The Inn at Hunt Phelan
 Town of La Grange
 Travellers Rest Plantation and Museum
 Tullahoma Campaign Civil War Trail
 Spring Hill Battlefield

Texas 

 Camp Ford Historic Site and Park
 Confederate Soldiers Monument
 Fort Bliss Museum
 Fort Brown and Historic Brownsville Museum
 Fort Davis National Historic Site
 Hill College History Complex
 Liendo Plantation
 Lorenzo de Zavala State Archives and Library Building
 Palmito Ranch Battlefield
 Palo Alto Battlefield National Historical Park
 Sabine Pass State Historical Park
 Sam Bell Maxey House State Historic Site
 Texas Governor's Mansion
 Texas Historical Commission's Library
 Texas State Cemetery
 The Rosenberg Library/Galveston and Texas History Center
 Treue Der Union Monument

Vermont 

 St. Albans Historical Museum

Virginia 

 Alexandria National Cemetery
 Appomattox Court House National Historical Park
 Arlington House, The Robert E. Lee Memorial
 Auto Driving Tour of Civil War Lynchburg
 Ball's Bluff Battlefield Regional Park
 Battle of Front Royal Driving Tour
 Belle Boyd Cottage
 Belle Grove Plantation
 Ben Lomond Historic Site
 Berkeley Plantation at Harrison's Landing
 Bermuda Hundred Campaign Tour
 Blandford Church and Cemetery
 Brandy Station Battlefield
 Bristoe Station Battlefield Heritage Park
 Cedar Creek Battlefield
 Cedar Mountain Battlefield
 Centre Hill Mansion
 Centre Hill Museum
 Christ Church
 Cold Harbor Battlefield and Visitors Center
 Cold Harbor Battlefield Park
 Colonial National Historical Park
 Colonial Williamsburg
 Cross Keys Battlefield
 Endview Plantation
 Fairfax Museum and Visitor Center
 First Day at Chancellorsville Battlefield
 Fisher's Hill
 Fort Ward Museum and Historic Site
 Fredericksburg and Spotsylvania National Military Park
 Fredericksburg Area Museum
 Gaines' Mill Battlefield
 George Washington's Boyhood Home at Ferry Farm
 Glendale Battlefield and Visitors Center
 Graffiti House at Brandy Station
 Harris Farm Battlefield
 Harrisonburg-Rockingham Historical Society
 Hatcher's Run Battlefield
 Historic Kenmore
 Hollywood Cemetery
 Hupp's Hill Civil War Park
 John B. Magruder's Dam No. 1
 Laurel Hill, Birthplace Of J.E.B. Stuart
 Lee Chapel and Museum
 Lee Hall Mansion
 Lee's Mill, Rivers Ridge Circle
 Malvern Hill Battlefield
 Manassas National Battlefield Park
 McDowell Battlefield
 Mosby Heritage Area, Rector House
 Museum of Culpeper History
 New Market Battlefield State Historical Park and Hall of Valor Museum
 North Anna Battlefield Park
 Old City Cemetery and Pest House Medical Museum
 Pamplin Historical Park and The National Museum of the Civil War Soldier
 Petersburg National Battlefield
 Poplar Grove National Cemetery
 Port Republic Battlefield
 Richmond National Battlefield Park
 Sailor's Creek Battlefield Historical State Park
 Sandusky Historic Site and Civil War Museum
 Siege Museum
 Skiffes Creek Redoubt
 Spotsylvania County Museum
 Spotsylvania Court House Historic District
 Staunton River Battlefield State Park
 Stonewall Confederate Cemetery
 Stonewall Jackson House
 Stonewall Jackson's Grave
 Stonewall Jackson's Headquarters Museum
 Stratford Hall Plantation
 Sully Historic Site
 Sutherlin Mansion
 The American Civil War Center at Historic Tredegar
 The Casemate Museum at Fort Monroe
 The Manassas Museum System
 The Mariners' Museum
 The Museum and White House of the Confederacy
 The Valentine Richmond History Center
 The Virginia Capitol
 Third Winchester Battlefield
 Virginia Historical Society
 Virginia Military Institute Museum
 Virginia War Museum
 Warren Rifles Confederate Museum
 White Oak Civil War Museum
 White Oak Road Battlefield
 Young's Mill

West Virginia 

 Belle Boyd House and Civil War Museum and Archives
 Bulltown Historic Area
 Camp Allegheny
 Carnifex Ferry Battlefield State Park
 Cheat Summit Fort
 Droop Mountain Battlefield State Park
 Grafton National Cemetery
 Harpers Ferry National Historical Park
 Jackson's Mill Historic Area
 Jenkins Plantation Museum
 Lewisburg National Register Historic District/Greenbrier County Visitor Center
 Philippi Covered Bridge
 Philippi Historic District
 Rich Mountain Battlefield Civil War Site
 Shepherdstown Historic District
 West Virginia Independence Hall Museum

Wisconsin 

 Kenosha Civil War Museum
 Wisconsin Veterans Museum

References

External links
civilwar.org
 Heritage Sites at American Battlefield Trust
 

Discovery Trail
Auto trails in the United States